Hypoosmolar hyponatremia is a condition where hyponatremia associated with a low plasma osmolality. The term "hypotonic hyponatremia" is also sometimes used.

When the plasma osmolarity is low, the extracellular fluid volume status may be in one of three states: low volume, normal volume, or high volume.

Cause

Low blood volume (hypovolemic)
Loss of water is accompanied by loss of sodium.

Extrarenal (urine sodium < 10)
Excessive sweating
Burns
Vomiting
Diarrhea
Urinary loss (urine sodium > 20)
Diuretic drugs (especially thiazides)
Addison's disease
Cerebral salt-wasting syndrome
Other salt-wasting kidney diseases

Treat underlying cause and give IV isotonic saline. It is important to note that sudden restoration of blood volume to normal will turn off the stimulus for continued ADH secretion. Hence, a prompt water diuresis will occur. This can cause a sudden and dramatic increase the serum sodium concentration and place the patient at risk for so-called "central pontine myelinolysis" (CPM). That disorder is characterized by major neurologic damage, often of a permanent nature.

Because of the risk of CPM, people with low volume hyponatremia may eventually require water infusion as well as volume replacement. Doing so lessens the chance of a too rapid increase of the serum sodium level as blood volume rises and ADH levels fall.

In people who are volume depleted, i.e., their blood volume is too low, ADH secretion is increased, since volume depletion is a potent stimulus for ADH secretion. As a result, the kidneys of such patients recover water and produce a fairly concentrated urine. Treatment is simple (if not without risk)  — simply restore the patient's blood volume, thereby turning off the stimulus for ongoing ADH release and water retention.

It is worth considering separately, the hyponatremia that occurs in the setting of diuretic use. Patients taking diuretic medications such as furosemide (Lasix), hydrochlorothiazide, chlorthalidone, etc., become volume depleted. That is to say that their diuretic medicine, by design, has caused their kidneys to produce more urine than they would otherwise make. This extra urine represents blood volume that is no longer there, that has been lost from the body. As a result, their blood volume is reduced. As mentioned above, lack of adequate blood volume is a potent stimulus for ADH secretion and thence water retention.

Normal blood volume (euvolemic)
Some patients with hyponatremia have normal or slightly elevated blood volume. In those patients, the increased ADH activity and subsequent water retention may be due to "physiologic" causes of ADH release such as pain or nausea.

Alternatively, they may have the Syndrome of Inappropriate ADH (SIADH). SIADH represents the sustained, non-physiologic release of ADH and most often occurs as a side effect of certain medicines, lung problems such as pneumonia or abscess, brain disease, or certain cancers (most often small cell lung carcinoma). The cornerstone of therapy for SIADH is reduction of water intake.  If hyponatremia persists, then demeclocycline (an antibiotic with the side effect of inhibiting ADH) can be used.  SIADH can also be treated with specific antagonists of the ADH receptors, such as conivaptan or tolvaptan.

Another cause is psychogenic polydipsia.

Increased blood volume (hypervolemic)
A third group of people with hyponatremia are often said to be "hypervolemic". They are identified by the presence of peripheral edema. In fact, the term "hypervolemic" is misleading since their blood volume is actually low. The edema underscores the fact that fluid has left the circulation, i.e., the edema represents fluid that has exited the circulation and settled in dependent areas. Since such patients do, in fact, have reduced blood volume, and since reduced blood volume is a potent stimulus for ADH release, it is easy to see why they have retained water and become hyponatremic. Treatment of these patients involves treating the underlying disease that caused the fluid to leak out of the circulation in the first place. In many cases, this is easier said than done when one recognizes that the responsible underlying conditions are diseases such as liver cirrhosis or heart failure — conditions that are notoriously difficult to manage, let alone cure.

High volume. There is retention of water.
Congestive heart failure
Hypothyroidism and hypocortisolism
Liver cirrhosis
Nephrotic syndrome
Psychogenic polydipsia

Placing the patient on water restriction can also help in these cases.

Diagnosis

Treatment

usage of glucose solution

References

Electrolyte disturbances